Richard Akinnola is a Nigerian journalist, author, lawyer, and activist. He was the editor of the Vanguard Newspaper and is an executive director of the Centre for Free Speech organisation. He has contributed articles to media organisations and is the author of several books.

Career 
For many years, Akinnola covered the judicial beat and became the editor of the Vanguard Newspapers in Nigeria. He has researched and published several books on media, law, and national development. He is a member of the Nigerian Union of Journalists and Civil Liberties Organisation.

Writings

Newspaper articles 
 Did I betray Richard Akinnola?
 A Plea to the Protesters
 Oshiomhole's Deceptive Apology

Books 
 Abiola, Democracy, and Rule of Law OCLC Number 41712844
 History of Coup D'etats in Nigeria OCLC Number 44812276
 Nigerian Media and Legal Constraints OCLC Number 48014783

References 



Living people
Nigerian journalists
Nigerian publishers (people)
Nigerian human rights activists
Year of birth missing (living people)